Pauperojapyx is a genus of diplurans in the family Japygidae.

Species
 Pauperojapyx iban Pagés, 1995

References

Diplura